Viola eminens is a perennial, stolon-spreading herb in the genus Viola, native to southeastern Australia (South Australia, Victoria, and New South Wales).

References

Flora of New South Wales
Garden plants of Australia
Malpighiales of Australia
eminens
Plants described in 2003
Taxa named by Suzanne Mary Prober
Taxa named by Kevin Thiele